Dunn Center is a city in Dunn County, North Dakota, United States. The population was 227 at the 2020 census. Dunn Center was founded in 1914.

History
Dunn Center was laid out in 1914, when the railroad was extended to that point. The city was so named on account of its central location in Dunn County.

Geography
Dunn Center is located at  (47.353307, -102.622740).

Dunn Center is located on North Dakota Highway 200, east of Lake Ilo.

Demographics

2010 census
As of the census of 2010, there were 146 people in 66 households, including 38 families, in the city. The racial makup of the city was 93.8% White, 1.4% Native American, 0.7% from other races, and 4.1% from two or more races. Hispanic or Latino of any race were 1.4%.

Of the 66 households, 27.3% had children under the age of 18 living with them, 48.5% were married couples living together, 6.1% had a female householder with no husband present, 3.0% had a male householder with no wife present, and 42.4% were non-families. 33.3% of households were one person and 19.7% were one person aged 65 or older. The average household size was 2.21 and the average family size was 2.82.

The median age was 39.2 years. 21.9% of residents were under the age of 18; 8.2% were between the ages of 18 and 24; 27.4% were from 25 to 44; 23.9% were from 45 to 64; and 18.5% were 65 or older. The gender makeup of the city was 51.4% male and 48.6% female.

2000 census
As of the census of 2000, there were 122 people in 58 households, including 33 families, in the city. The population density was 304.5 people per square mile (117.8/km). There were 81 housing units at an average density of 202.2 per square mile (78.2/km). The racial makup of the city was 90.98% White, 6.56% Native American, and 2.46% from two or more races.

Of the 58 households, 15.5% had children under the age of 18 living with them, 50.0% were married couples living together, 3.4% had a female householder with no husband present, and 43.1% were non-families. 36.2% of households were one person and 20.7% were one person aged 65 or older. The average household size was 2.10 and the average family size was 2.67.

The age distribution was 16.4% under the age of 18, 4.9% from 18 to 24, 23.0% from 25 to 44, 32.8% from 45 to 64, and 23.0% 65 or older. The median age was 49 years. For every 100 females, there were 90.6 males. For every 100 females age 18 and over, there were 92.5 males.

The median household income was $23,500 and the median family income was $27,500. Males had a median income of $18,750 versus $16,071 for females. The per capita income for the city was $13,736. There were 8.3% of families and 9.6% of the population living below the poverty line, including no under eighteens and 3.1% of those over 64.

Climate
This climatic region is typified by large seasonal temperature differences, with warm to hot (and often humid) summers and cold (sometimes severely cold) winters.  According to the Köppen Climate Classification system, Dunn Center has a humid continental climate, abbreviated "Dfb" on climate maps.

Education
It is zoned to the Killdeer School District.

References

Cities in North Dakota
Cities in Dunn County, North Dakota
Populated places established in 1914
1914 establishments in North Dakota